{{DISPLAYTITLE:C15H10O7}}
The molecular formula C15H10O7 (molar mass: 302.23 g/mol, exact mass :302.042653 u) may refer to:

 Herbacetin, a flavonol 
 Hypolaetin, a flavone
 Morin (molecule), a flavonol
 Quercetin, a flavonol
 Tricetin, a flavone

Molecular formulas